"Got to Be There" is the debut solo single by the American recording artist Michael Jackson, written by Elliot Willensky and released as a single on October 7, 1971, on Motown Records. The song was produced by Hal Davis and recorded at Motown's Hitsville West studios in Hollywood.

The single became an immediate success, reaching number one on Cashbox's pop and R&B singles charts, while reaching number four on Billboard's pop and R&B singles charts. Released to select European countries, it also found success, reaching number five in the UK. The song was composed as a pop ballad with soul and soft rock elements. The song was musically arranged by Dave Blumberg while Willie Hutch produced its vocal arrangements.

Motown label mates Smokey Robinson & The Miracles released their version on their 1972 album Flying High Together, while Diana Ross recorded a version of the song for her unreleased 1973 album To The Baby which was eventually issued as part of the 2010 Expanded Edition of her Touch Me In The Morning album. R&B group Black Ivory recorded a version on their 1972 debut album entitled, "Don't Turn Around", which peaked at No. 13 on the Billboard's R&B chart.

A cover version of the song by Chaka Khan from her eponymous fourth solo album reached #5 on the R&B Charts in 1983.

Track listing
A. "Got To Be There" – 3:23
B. "Maria (You Were the Only One)" – 3:41

Live performances 
 Hellzapoppin: Jackson performed "Got To Be There" for the first time at Hellzapoppin' at  March 1, 1972 with his brothers, along with Sugar Daddy and Brand New Thing. The performance is about 2 minutes and it included an intro showing a garage door opening revealing the Jackson 5.
 Live at the Forum: The performance is similar to the one from Hellzapoppin'. It was recorded on August 26, 1972,  and released on June 21, 2010.
 Jackson 5 In Japan: Audio recording from the concert in Japan at April 30, 1973 was released on the album "Jackson 5 in Japan". Here, the performance is almost 4 minutes and it had a spoken line for intro.

Chart performance

Weekly charts

Year-end charts

Sales and certifications

Personnel
Written and composed by Elliot Willensky
Produced by Hal Davis
Lead vocals by Michael Jackson
Background vocals by Jackie Jackson, Tito Jackson, Jermaine Jackson, and Marlon Jackson
Arrangement by Dave Blumberg
Vocal arrangement by Willie Hutch

Cover versions
 Fellow Motown recording act The Miracles recorded the track for their final studio album, Flying High Together, in 1972.
 In 1972, R&B Group, Black Ivory recorded a version on their top R&B 20 debut album, "Don't Turn Around". It was the B-side to their top 40 single, "Time Is Love".
 In 1982, Chaka Khan had a top 5 R&B hit version with the song, featured on her self-titled album.
 In 1993, George Benson performed the track using his guitar and vocal hums on his 1993 album, Love Remembers.
 In 2007, group Boyz II Men covered it for their 2007 release, Motown: A Journey Through Hitsville USA.

See also
List of Cash Box Top 100 number-one singles of 1972

References

External links 
 List of cover versions of "Got to Be There" at SecondHandSongs.com

Michael Jackson songs
1971 debut singles
Song recordings produced by Hal Davis
Cashbox number-one singles
Pop ballads
Rhythm and blues ballads
1970s ballads
Motown singles
1971 songs